Jan Coffey is a joint pen name for the American writers James A. McGoldrick and Nikoo Kafi McGoldrick, a married couple. They also write historical-romance novels as May McGoldrick and other suspense-romance novels as Nicole Cody. As Nikoo McGoldrick & James A. McGoldrick, they also wrote the book Marriage of Minds.

Biography
James A. McGoldrick and Nikoo Kafi met in 1979 in Stonington, Connecticut, and married the following year. He has a PhD in sixteenth-century British literature and she was a manufacturing engineer. They have two children and reside in California.

Bibliography

As May McGoldrick

MacPherson Family Saga Series
 Angel of the Skye (1996/05)
 Heart of the Gold (1996/11)
 The Beauty of the Mist (1997/04)
 The Intended (1998/03)
 Flame (1998/09)
 Tess and the Highlander (2002/10)
 The Thistle and the Rose (1995/09, prequel)

Highland Treasury Series
 The Dreamer (2000/05)
 The Enchantress (2000/08)
 The Firebrand (2000/11)

Rebel promise Series
 The Promise (2001/09)
 The Rebel (2002/07)

Scottish dreams Series
 Borrowed Dreams (2003/06)
 Captured Dreams (2003/12)
 Dreams of Destiny (2004/05)

Nineteenth-century British romance 

Ghost of the Thames (2011)

The Scottish Relic trilogy 

Much Ado About Highlanders (2017)
Taming the Highlander (2017)
Tempest in the Highlands (2017)

A Midsummer Wedding (2018, novella)

The Pennington Family 

Romancing the Scot (2017)
It Happened in the Highlands (2018)
Sleepless in Scotland (2018)

 Sweet Home Highland Christmas (2018, novella)

Royal Highlander 

 Highland Crown (2019)
 Highland Jewel (2019)
Highland Sword (2020)

Standalone Novellas

 Mercy
 Thanksgiving in Connecticut (2012)

Contemporary Romance

 Made in Heaven (2011)

As Nikoo McGoldrick & James A. McGoldrick

Non-fiction
 Marriage of Minds (2000/06)
 Step Write Up (2009/11)

As Jan Coffey

Single novels

 Trust Me Once (2001/07)
 Twice Burned (2002/07)
 Triple Threat (2003/07)
 Fourth Victim (2004/07)
 Tropical Kiss (2005/05)
 Five in a Row (2005/07)
 Silent Waters (2006/04)
 The Project (2007/01, reissued as Cross Wired)
 The Deadliest Strain (2008/01)
 The Puppet Master (2009/01)
 Blind Eye (2009/09)
 Aquarian (2012)

As Nicole Cody

Single novels
 Love and Mayhem (2006/04, reissued as Arsenic and Old Armor)

References and sources

External links
 Jan Coffey at Harper Collins

20th-century American novelists
Living people
Collective pseudonyms
21st-century American novelists
American young adult novelists
Married couples
American romantic fiction writers
American historical novelists
People from Watertown, Connecticut
Year of birth missing (living people)